Small Business Server can refer to:
 Novell Small Business Server
 Windows Small Business Server